Christianity is the largest religion in Northern Ireland. At the 2021 census, the prevalence rates for the main religions were: Catholic (42 per cent); Presbyterian (16 per cent); Church of Ireland (11.5 per cent); Methodist (2.4 per cent); Other Christian or Christian-related denominations (6.9 per cent); other Religions and Philosophies (1.3 per cent); those declaring no religion  (17.4 per cent) and religion not stated (1.5 per cent). The Catholic Church has seen a small growth in adherents, while the other Christian groups have seen a small decrease.

There are also small Hindu, Sikh, Muslim, Buddhist and Jewish communities. Belfast has a synagogue, a gurdwara, a mosque and two Hindu temples. There is another gurdwara in Derry.

Statistics

The 2001 and 2011 Census figures for Religion (not Religion or Religion Brought Up In) are set out below.

The religious affiliations in the local authority districts (themselves not merged since 2011" of Northern Ireland were as follows:

Religions broken down by place of birth in the 2011 census.

The religious affiliations in the different age bands in the 2011 census were as follows:

Christianity

Christianity is the main religion in Northern Ireland. The 2011 UK census showed 40.8% Catholic, 19.1% Presbyterian Church, with the Church of Ireland having 13.7% and the Methodist Church 5.0%. Members of other Christian churches comprised 5.8%, 17% stated they have no religion or did not state a religion, and members of non-Christian religions were 0.8%.

The Catholic Church is the largest single church. The Church is organised into four provinces though these are not coterminous with the modern political division of Ireland. The seat of the Archbishop of Armagh, the Primacy of Ireland, is St. Patrick's Cathedral, Armagh.

The Presbyterian Church in Ireland, closely -but not formally - linked to the Church of Scotland in terms of theology and history, is the second-largest church and largest Protestant denomination. It is followed by the Anglican Church of Ireland, which was the state church of Ireland until it was disestablished by the Irish Church Act 1869. In 2002, the much smaller Methodist Church in Ireland signed a covenant for greater co-operation and potential ultimate unity with the Church of Ireland. The Church of Ireland is part of the Anglican Communion.

Smaller Protestant denominations such as the Free Presbyterian Church of Ulster, Reformed Presbyterian Church of Ireland amongst Presbyterians and the Open Brethren exist in many rural communities. The Association of Baptist Churches in Ireland and the Assemblies of God Ireland are also organised on an all-Ireland basis, though in the case of the Assemblies of God this was the result of a recent reorganisation.

Comparison with Great Britain
In the 2011 census Northern Ireland had substantially more people stating that they were Christian (82.2%) than did England (59.4%), Scotland (53.8%) or Wales (57.6%). The proportion who stated that they had any religion was also higher in Northern Ireland (83%) than in England (68.1%), Scotland (56.3%) or Wales (60.3%). In Northern Ireland those who did not state any religion in the 2011 census amounted to 13.9% of the population, lower than in England (31.9%), Scotland (43.7%) or Wales (39.7%). This represented an increase from the 2001 census in those not stating a religion of 11.7% in Northern Ireland, lower than the increases in England (54.5%), Scotland (38.1%) or Wales (57.6%).

Secularisation in Northern Ireland has followed different paths within each of the two main communities, being at a more advanced stage within the mainly Protestant community in which it is reflected more often with a formal move away from the churches and by expressing no formal religious attachment, mirroring the pattern in Great Britain, whereas in the mainly Catholic community it is reflected by declining mass attendance but often with retaining a formal Catholic identification, mirroring the pattern in the Republic of Ireland. Those stating that they had no religion in the 2011 census were concentrated in largely Protestant areas, suggesting that they were mostly from a Protestant background.

Comparison with the Republic of Ireland
In their respective 2011 censuses Northern Ireland had a lower proportion of people stating that they were Christian (82.3%) than the Republic of Ireland (90.4%) and had a higher proportion of people stating that they had no religion or not indicating a religious belief (16.9%) than the Republic of Ireland (7.6%). While in the 2011 census 84.2% of people in the Republic of Ireland identified themselves as Catholic in the 2011 census in Northern Ireland only 40.8% identified themselves as Catholic.

Minor religions

Islam

While there were a small number of Muslims already living in what became Northern Ireland in 1921, the bulk of Muslims in Northern Ireland today come from families who immigrated during the late 20th century.  At the time of the 2011 Census there were 3,832 living in Northern Ireland, though the Belfast Islamic Centre states this number may be as high as 10,000 due to other social demographics such as students. The Muslims in Northern Ireland come from over 40 countries of origin, from Western Europe all the way through to the Far East. This situation is reflected in comparably complex institutional arrangements.

Judaism

The earliest recorded Jew living in Northern Ireland was a tailor by the name of Manuel Lightfoot in 1652. The first Jewish congregation in Northern Ireland, Belfast Hebrew Congregation, was founded in 1870. In 2006, there were an estimated 300 Jewish people living in Northern Ireland.

Baháʼí Faith

The Baháʼí Faith in Northern Ireland begins after a century of contact between Irishmen and Baháʼís beyond the island and on the island. The members of the religion elected its first Baháʼí Local Spiritual Assembly in 1949 in Belfast. The Baháʼís held an international conference in Dublin in 1982 which was described as “…one of the very few occasions when a world event for a faith community has been held in Ireland". By 1993 there were a dozen assemblies in Northern Ireland. By 2005 Baháʼí  sources claim some 300 Baháʼís across Northern Ireland.

Neo-paganism

Hinduism

Hinduism is a relatively minor religion in Northern Ireland with only around 200 Hindu families in the region. There are, however, three Mandirs in Belfast.

History

The Troubles

The Troubles were a period of ethno-political conflict in Northern Ireland which spilled over at various times into Great Britain and the Republic of Ireland. The duration of the Troubles is conventionally dated from approximately 1968 to the signing of the Belfast Agreement in 1998. Violence nonetheless continued beyond this period and still manifests on a small-scale basis.

The principal issues at stake in the Troubles were the constitutional status of Northern Ireland and the relationship between the mainly-Protestant Unionist and mainly-Catholic Nationalist communities in Northern Ireland. The Troubles had both political and military (or paramilitary) dimensions.  Its participants included politicians and political activists on both sides, republican and loyalist paramilitary organisations, the Royal Ulster Constabulary, the British Army and the security forces of the Republic of Ireland.

See also
Demography of Northern Ireland
Religion in the United Kingdom
Religion in the Republic of Ireland

References

External links
Homepage of the Irish Bishops' Conference (Catholic)
CatholicIreland.net, Content-rich portal of the Catholic Church in Ireland
Presbyterian Church in Ireland
Church of Ireland
Methodist Church in Ireland
Association of Baptist Churches in Ireland
Assemblies of God Ireland